The 2015 Thurrock Council election took place on 7 May 2015 to elect members of Thurrock Council in England. This was on the same day as the general election and other local elections. Elections were held in 16 wards for seats that were last contested in 2011, to elect roughly one third of the council. 

Following the election, the Labour minority administration continued in government.

Result

Council Composition
Prior to the election the composition of the council was:

After the election the composition of the council was:

I - Independent

Results by ward
Each of the 16 wards elected one councillor for this election. Incumbent councillors are marked by an asterisk.

Aveley & Uplands

Belhus

Chadwell St. Mary

Chafford & North Stifford

Coxshall previously served as Councillor for the Corringham & Fobbing ward from 2011-2015.

Corringham & Fobbing

East Tilbury

Grays Riverside

Grays Thurrock

Little Thurrock Rectory

Ockendon

Stanford East & Corringham Town

Stanford-Le-Hope West

Stifford Clays

The Homesteads

Tilbury Riverside & Thurrock Park

West Thurrock & South Stifford

References

2015 English local elections
May 2015 events in the United Kingdom
2015
2010s in Essex